Lamberton was the name of a port community on the Delaware River in Mercer County, New Jersey, United States. It was annexed by the city of Trenton as part of South Trenton in 1856. It is now known simply as Waterfront.

Lamberton is often incorrectly attributed as the birthplace of Zebulon Pike, for whom Pikes Peak (in Colorado) was named, though the explorer was born in another Lamberton, now known as Lamington, in Bedminster Township in Somerset County.

References

Trenton, New Jersey
Unincorporated communities in Mercer County, New Jersey
Unincorporated communities in New Jersey